William Crowther (1834 – 15 March 1900) was a Mayor of Auckland and then Member of Parliament for Auckland, New Zealand.

Crowther was Mayor of Auckland from 1891 to 1893, after serving as a city councillor for sixteen years.

Crowther represented the City of Auckland multi-member electorate first as a Liberal Party then independent conservative from 1893 to 1900, when he died of stomach cancer, aged 66. The resulting by-election on 27 April 1900 was hotly contested, and won by Joseph Witheford.

Businessman

William Crowther was born in Slaithwaite, West Riding of Yorkshire, in 1834. Aged nineteen, he migrated to Victoria, and was a successful contractor on the goldfields for ten years. He was then attracted to Otago by the Otago Gold Rush to the Dunstan, and brought with him a number of teams of horses and waggons. He later moved to Auckland and founded a horse-drawn bus service between Auckland and Remuera, based in the Victoria stables, Wellesley Street East, which he built.

Politician

As well as serving on the city council and as Mayor of Auckland,  Mr. Crowther was also a member of the governing body of Auckland College and Grammar school, the University College Council, the city schools' committee, the Charitable Aid Board, and Sailors' Home. For some years he was a member of the Harbour Board, and was chairman for a term.

Crowther changed his allegiance from the Liberal Party to Independent before the 1896 election.

Death
Crowther died on 15 March 1900 and was buried at Purewa Cemetery in the Auckland suburb of Meadowbank.

Notes

References

External links

1834 births
1900 deaths
New Zealand Liberal Party MPs
Members of the New Zealand House of Representatives
Mayors of Auckland
New Zealand MPs for Auckland electorates
People from Slaithwaite
English emigrants to Australia
English emigrants to New Zealand
19th-century New Zealand politicians
Auckland Harbour Board members
Burials at Purewa Cemetery